Phragmipedium schlimii is a species of orchid endemic to Colombia.

References

External links 

schlimii
Endemic orchids of Colombia